Chris Edwards (born December 22, 1973) is an American former professional vert skater.

Edwards was born in Escondido, California. He started skating when he was thirteen years old in 1986 and turned professional in 1995. Edwards resides in Pittsburgh, Pennsylvania. He was one of the early members of Team Rollerblade and is one of the most important early figures in aggressive skating. Edwards appears in the 1993 rollerblading film Airborne and the 2002 video game Aggressive Inline, which is available for the PlayStation 2, Xbox, and GameCube.

Edwards has had some inline skates named after him: tarmac CE (Chris Edwards), Edwards Chocolate (street), Edwards Trooper (vert) and Edwards Daytona,"CE Speedsters", and the "CE Hermes" circa 1994 - 1999.

He is considered by many of his peers and aggressive skaters in general to be the founding father of aggressive inline.

Vert competitions 
1999 X Games, San Francisco, California  - Vert: 10th
1998 X Games, San Diego, California - High Jump: 2nd
1997 X Games, San Diego, California  - Vert: 3rd 
1997 X Games, San Diego, California  - Vert: 2nd
1996 X Games, Providence, Rhode Island - Vert: 3rd
1995 X Games, Providence, Rhode Island  - Vert: 4th

References

External links
skatelog.com
aggressive.com
aggressive.com
espn.go.com
geocities.com
acclaim.com
uk.dk.com

Vert skaters
1973 births
Living people
X Games athletes
Aggressive inline skaters
American roller skaters